Coeliades lorenzo, the Lorenzo red-tab policeman, is a butterfly of the family Hesperiidae. It is found in South Africa in the Maputaland forests of northern KwaZulu-Natal, and northwards into Mozambique.

The wingspan is 58–64 mm for males and 61–66 mm for females. Adults are on the wing year-round in warmer areas with peaks in late summer and autumn.

The larvae feed on Acridocarpus natalitius.

References

Coeliadinae
Butterflies described in 1947